Albert William Bendall (29 May 1884 – 3 May 1967) was an Australian politician.

He was born in Westbury, Tasmania. In 1922 he was elected to the Tasmanian House of Assembly as a Country Party member for Wilmot, although he soon joined the Nationalists when the Country Party in Tasmania disintegrated. He was defeated in 1925, but in 1932 he was elected to the Tasmanian Legislative Council as the independent member for Macquarie. He held the seat until his defeat in 1944. Bendall died in 1967 in New Norfolk.

References

1884 births
1967 deaths
National Party of Australia members of the Parliament of Tasmania
Nationalist Party of Australia members of the Parliament of Tasmania
Independent members of the Parliament of Tasmania
Members of the Tasmanian House of Assembly
Members of the Tasmanian Legislative Council
20th-century Australian politicians
People from Westbury, Tasmania